The Federated States of Micronesia is a federation divided into four states, which are further divided into various cities and municipalities.

States

Cities 
Palikir, Pohnpei State – National capital
Colonia, Yap State
Kolonia, Pohnpei State
Lelu, Kosrae
Tol, Chuuk State
Weno, Chuuk State

Municipalities

Chuuk State 
 Eot
 Ettal
 Fala-Beguets
 Fananu
 Fefan
 Kutu
 Losap
 Lukunor
 Magur
Moch
 Moen
 Murilo
 Nama
 Namoluk
 Nomwin
 Onari
 Oneop
 Ono
 Param
 Pis-Losap
 Pisaras
 Pulap
 Pulusuk
 Puluwat
 Romanum
 Ruo
 Satawan
 Ta
 Tamatam
 Tol
 Tonowas (Dublon)
 Tsis
 Udot
 Ulul
 Uman

Kosrae 
 Lelu
 Malem
 Tafunsak
 Utwa
 Walung

Pohnpei State 
 Kapingamarangi
 Kitti
 Kolonia
 Madolenihmw
 Mokil
 Nett
 Ngatik
 Nukuoro
 Oroluk
 Pingelap
 Sokehs
 Uh

Yap State 
 Dalipebinau
 Eauripik
 Elato
 Fais
 Fanif
 Faraulep
 Gaferut
 Gagil
 Gilman
 Ifalik
 Kanifay
 Lamotrek
 Maap
 Ngulu
 Pikelot
 Rull
 Rumung
 Satawal
 Sorol
 Tomil
 Ulithi
 Weloy
 Woleai

See also
ISO 3166-2:FM

References

External links 
 
 

 
Cities
Micronesia, Federated States of
Micronesia, Federated States of
Federated States of Micronesia-related lists